Uplifted is the second studio album by Nigerian singer Flavour N'abania. It was released on July 20, 2010, by Obaino Music and 2nite Entertainment. The album features guest appearances from Jay Dey, Oloye, Stormrex, Waga Gee, Asemstone, M-Jay, V.I.P and Elense. It was supported by four singles: "Nwa Baby" (Ashawo Remix), "Oyi (I Dey Catch Cold)", "Adamma" and "Odiro Easy".

Background
Flavour started recording the album after releasing his debut studio album, N'abania (2005). He produced three songs on the album; "Oyi (I Dey Catch Cold)", "Chinedum", and the techno-infused "Kjumanjo". Uplifted explores the genres of highlife, hip hop, reggae, dancehall, calypso and R&B. The album was recorded in Igbo, English and Nigerian pidgin. While recording the album, Flavour believed it would break national and cultural barriers that often diminish the value of music in Africa. The album was well received in Nigeria, South Africa and Botswana.

Singles 
"Nwa Baby (Ashawo Remix)" was released  on June 22, 2011, as the album's lead single. The song was written by Flavour and is a remake of Cardinal Rex's 1960 hit "Sawale". "Oyi (I Dey Catch Cold)" was released as the album's second single. The dance track "Adamma" was released as the album's third single. There were two music videos released for "Adamma". The second video was shot in South Africa by Godfather Productions and uploaded to YouTube on October 6, 2011.

Critical reception
In a review for ModernGhana, Onyinye Muomah said the artists featured on the album were subpar, but positively acknowledged Flavour for "incorporating new genres to his original kind of music".

Track listing

Personnel

Chinedu Okoli – primary artist
Jay Dey – featured artist
Oloye – featured artist
Stormrex – featured artist
Waga Gee – featured artist
Asemstone – featured artist 
M-Jay – featured artist
V.I.P. – featured artist 
Elense – featured artist

Release history

References

2010 albums
Flavour N'abania albums
Igbo-language albums